Leo W. Hebert (October 27, 1931 – October 28, 2020) was a Canadian curler. He played as third on the Lyall Dagg rink that won the 1964 Brier and World Championship.

In addition to his Brier and World championships, Hebert won three BC men's championships, three BC Senior Men's Championships and a BC Men's Masters Championship.
Hebert was also a blind curling coach for over 28 years. He was inducted into the Canadian Curling Hall of Fame in 2000. He is also a member of the BC Sports Hall of Fame.

Personal life
Hebert began curling at 9 years old. Hebert moved to Vancouver after high school and worked for Imperial Oil. At the time of the 1964 Worlds, Hebert worked for Allied Heat and Fuel Ltd. in Vancouver. In addition to curling, his background included ice hockey, baseball and softball. He had three children.

References

External links

 Video:  (channel "Curling Canada")

1931 births
2020 deaths
Brier champions
World curling champions
Canadian male curlers
People from Athabasca, Alberta
Curlers from Vancouver
Canadian curling coaches
20th-century Canadian people